Lauren Moore (born 30 January 1998) is an Australian netball player in the Suncorp Super Netball league, playing for Giants Netball.

Moore began playing for the Swifts in 2016, having been signed by the club at the end of the previous year at 17 years of age and whilst still in school. Moore played at both a state and national level as an under-17 player. She was relegated to a training partner position in the 2017 and 2018 seasons before reclaiming a full-time position at the Swifts ahead of the 2019 season.

References

External links
 New South Wales Swifts profile
 Suncorp Super Netball profile
 Netball Draft Central profile

1998 births
Australian netball players
New South Wales Swifts players
Living people
Suncorp Super Netball players
Australian Netball League players
Netball New South Wales Waratahs players
Netball players from New South Wales
New South Wales Institute of Sport netball players
People educated at St Peter's Catholic College, Tuggerah
Netball New South Wales Blues players
New South Wales state netball league players
People from the Central Coast (New South Wales)